Giuseppe Mosca (1772 in Naples – 1839 in Messina) was an Italian opera composer, the older brother of Luigi Mosca, also an opera composer. He is mainly remembered as the  composer who said that Rossini copied in La pietra del paragone  the "crescendo" from his opera  I pretendenti delusi.

Works
 aria "Mentre guardo, oh Dio! me stessa" from the opera Le bestie in uomini Ann Hallenberg, Fabio Biondi 2012

References

1772 births
1839 deaths
Italian opera composers
Male opera composers
19th-century Italian composers
19th-century Italian male musicians
Italian male composers